Bogdan Stamenković (born 19 January 1998) is a Serbian professional footballer who plays as a forward.

Career

Spartak Subotica

2016–17 season
Born in Surdulica, Stamenković started playing football with football club Čelik from Belo Polje. After five years at Čelik, Stamenković joined Radnik Surdulica, where he stayed until 2012. After he graduated from elementary school, Stamenković moved to Spartak Subotica. He signed his first scholarship contract with the club in early 2017, after which he moved to the Serbian League Vojvodina side Bačka 1901 on dual registration, scoring two goals on 9 matches until the end of the 2016–17 campaign. Stamenković made his official debut for the first team of Spartak Subotica in 3–0 away defeat against his former club Radnik Surdulica. He joined the game replacing Milivoj Krmar in 72 minute of the Serbian SuperLiga match played on 22 April 2017, under coach Andrey Chernyshov. He also noted an appearance in a match against Borac Čačak. During the season, Stamenković played with reserves respective.

2017–18 season
Returning to the squad in summer 2017 and after he overgrown youth selection, Stamenković joined the first team as a fully senior and regular member in summer 2017. As he started the 2017–18 Serbian SuperLiga as a back-up choice, without official appearances under coach Aleksandar Veselinović, he moved on loan to Bratstvo Prigrevica. Playing the whole 15 caps for the first half-season as a bonus player in the Serbian League Vojvodina, Stamenković scored 5 goals and made 3 assists, having also marked with 7.03 average rating. At the beginning of December, a loan deal was terminated and he returned to Spartak. In February 2018, passing the winter-break with Spartak, Stamenković extended a loan deal to Bratstvo Prigrevica until the end of season.

Playing style
Stamenković is a right-footed striker, who is capable of playing as a centre forward, attacking midfielder, or left winger. At the age of 19, Stamenković was described as a mobile footballer with good ball control and technique. At 1.82 m high, he is also described as dominant in the air and a good header.

Career statistics

Club

References

External links
 Soccerway.com Profile
 
 
 

1998 births
Living people
People from Surdulica
Association football forwards
Serbian footballers
FK Bačka 1901 players
FK Spartak Subotica players
FK Radnik Surdulica players
Kavala F.C. players
Volos N.F.C. players
Serbian SuperLiga players
Serbian League players
Super League Greece 2 players
Super League Greece players
Serbian expatriate footballers
Serbian expatriate sportspeople in Greece